The East Germany national junior handball team was the national under–20 handball team of East Germany. Controlled by the East German Handball Federation, it represented East Germany in international matches.

Statistics

IHF Junior World Championship record
 Champions   Runners up   Third place   Fourth place

References

External links
World Men's Youth Championship table
European Men's Youth Championship table

Handball in East Germany
Men's national junior handball teams
Handball